Fernando Díaz (fl. 1071–1106) was a Spanish nobleman and military leader.

Fernando Díaz may also refer to:
Fernando Díaz (baseball) (1924–1992), former outfielder in Negro league baseball
Fernando Díaz Alberdi (born 1972), former Argentine rugby union footballer, now coach
Fernando Díaz Domínguez (1932–1983), Cuban-American artist
Fernando Díaz Seguel (born 1961), Chilean football manager and former goalkeeper
Fernando Díaz de Haro, Spanish noble of the House of Haro
Fernando Díaz del Río (born 2003), Spanish artistic swimmer
Fernando Díaz (count in Lantarón and Cerezo)